George Murison (1819–1889) was mayor of Hamilton, Ontario in 1870 and also served on city council for over 15 years.

References

External links

 1870 - George Murison

Mayors of Hamilton, Ontario
1820 births
1889 deaths